State Route 89 (SR 89) is a state highway in the U.S. state of California that travels in the north–south direction, serving as a major thoroughfare for many mountain communities in the Sierra Nevada and the Cascade Range. It starts from U.S. Route 395 near Topaz Lake, winding its way up to the  Monitor Pass, down to the Carson River, and up again over the  Luther Pass. From that point on, the route generally loses elevation on its way past Lake Tahoe, through Tahoe and Plumas National Forests until Lake Almanor. For roughly nine miles the route is then a part of State Route 36. The route then ascends to the  Morgan Summit. After it enters Lassen Volcanic National Park it continues to gain elevation until it reaches its highest point in an unnamed pass in the middle of Lassen Peak and Bumpass Mountain.

Route description

SR 89 begins at an intersection with US 395. The highway goes west through a few switchbacks before crossing into Alpine County and the Humboldt-Toiyabe National Forest. The route over Monitor Pass is typically closed during the winter due to snow accumulation. SR 89 continues by Heenan Lake before intersecting with the eastern end of SR 4 and turning northwest, passing through Markleeville. SR 89 continues northwest to the town of Woodfords, where it turns west, running concurrently with SR 88 for a brief distance before turning into El Dorado County. The section of SR 89 from SR 88 north to US 50 is co-signed as US 50 Alternate for use as a detour for when US 50 closes.

The highway continues north to Meyers, where it runs concurrently with US 50 into the city of South Lake Tahoe. SR 89 continues along the western shore of Lake Tahoe, where it passes through Camp Richardson, Emerald Bay, Meeks Bay, Pomins, and Tahoma. After crossing into Placer County, SR 89 passes through Chambers Lodge, Homewood, Tahoe Pines, Skyland, Timberland, Pineland, and Tahoe Tavern before coming to an intersection with SR 28, where SR 89 continues to the west, away from the lake. The road curves to the north through Tahoe National Forest before crossing into Nevada County and the city of Truckee. This portion of the highway has been designated the "10th Mountain Division Memorial Highway", honoring the US Army division that lost 992 soldiers during the Italian Campaign in World War II.

SR 89 runs concurrently with I-80 eastbound briefly before exiting to the north and continuing through the city of Truckee and passing near Prosser Creek Reservoir outside of the city limits. SR 89 continues through Hobart Mills before crossing into Sierra County and continuing northwest to Randolph and Sierraville, where it shares a wrong-way concurrency with SR 49 through the town of Sattley; they then intersect CR A23 before SR 89 splits off to the northwest. SR 89 continues through Calpine before crossing into Plumas County.

SR 89 continues through Clio and Graeagle before running concurrently with SR 70 through Plumas National Forest, passing through Blairsden, Feather River Inn, Cromberg, Spring Garden, Massack (where SR 70 and 89 have a rest area), East Quincy, and the city of Quincy. SR 70 and SR 89 continue north through Keddie before SR 89 splits off to the north and passes through Indian Falls, Crescent Mills, Greenville, and Canyondam. The section of SR 89 from SR 70 north to Crescent Mills was built over the abandoned railway bed of the Indian Valley Railroad. SR 89 intersects with the south end of SR 147 before paralleling the southern shore of Lake Almanor and running concurrently with SR 36 westbound, crossing into Tehama County and Lassen National Forest.

SR 36 and SR 89 intersect the northern terminus of SR 32 and SR 172 before SR 36 splits off to the west and SR 89 enters Lassen Volcanic National Park. The SR 89 state designation officially does not run through the national park, and this segment is directly under the park's jurisdiction instead of Caltrans. When it is open, a park fee is charged. The segment through the park is typically closed during the winter due to very heavy snowfall and snowpack. Outside the other park entrance in the northwest corner in Shasta County, SR 89 forms a concurrency with SR 44, heading northeast to Old Station.

After splitting from SR 44 at Old Station, SR 89 continues north through Hat Creek and Doyles Corner before intersecting SR 299. The highway passes through Four Corners and Cayton before intersecting CR A19 and crossing into Siskiyou County. SR 89 briefly passes through the Klamath National Forest and Bartle and McCloud before coming to an interchange with I-5. SR 89 then merges with Mount Shasta Boulevard and terminates just outside the Mount Shasta City city limits.

One point of interest along California State Route 89 includes the Pony Express remount station in Woodfords, the Lake Tahoe Outlet Gates in Tahoe City (control of these gates was the source of the two-decade "Tahoe Water War" between lakeshore owners and downstream Truckee River water users), Plumas-Eureka State Park (containing Johnsville, a well-preserved '49er town, and Pioneer Ski Area, the first sport skiing area in the Western hemisphere), Lake Almanor and Lassen Volcanic National Park.

Many other points of interest, including Brokeoff Mountain, Sulphur Works, Emerald Lake, Lake Helen, Bumpass Hell, Lassen Peak and Summit Lake are also located on this highway.

SR 89 is part of the California Freeway and Expressway System, and north of the southern SR 44 junction is part of the National Highway System, a network of highways that are considered essential to the country's economy, defense, and mobility by the Federal Highway Administration. SR 89 is eligible for the State Scenic Highway System; however, it is only a scenic highway as designated by Caltrans from the El Dorado-Placer county line to a point 3.2 miles west of the US 395 junction, meaning that it is a substantial section of highway passing through a "memorable landscape" with no "visual intrusions", where the potential designation has gained popular favor with the community. From the junction with SR 147, through the park and including the gap on SR 44, to its terminus at I-5, SR 89 is part of the Volcanic Legacy Scenic Byway, a National Scenic Byway. The segment of SR 89 from I-80 in Truckee to SR 49 through Sattley also forms part of the Yuba-Donner Scenic Byway, a National Forest Scenic Byway.

Major intersections

See also

References

External links

AARoads- State Route 89
Caltrans: Route 89 highway conditions
California Highways: SR 89

089
089
State Route 089
State Route 089
State Route 089
State Route 089
State Route 089
State Route 089
State Route 089
State Route 089
State Route 089
State Route 089
Sierra Nevada (United States)